This Machine is the debut extended play released by a New Zealand band, The Naked and Famous. It was released on May 5 of 2008.

Critical reception
Sunday Star Times reviewer Grant Smithies said "I’ve no doubt these songs will still be lighting my fuse long after 2008 has shuddered to a close."

Track listing

Personnel 
Credits adapted from the liner notes of This Machine.

Visuals and imagery
 Joel Kefali – art, design
 Campbell Hooper – art, design
 Troy Photography – photography
 Special Problems – photography

Instruments
 Ben Knapp – bass (tracks: 2, 6)
 Jordan Clark – live drums (tracks: 2, 5–6)

Technical and production
 Aaron Short – engineering, mixing, production
 Thom Powers – engineering, mixing, production
 Ben Knapp – engineering elements (tracks: 1–2, 5–6)
 Angus McNaughton – mastering

Release history

References

2008 debut EPs
Alternative rock EPs
The Naked and Famous albums